Mizolastine (Mizollen) is a once-daily, non-sedating antihistamine. It blocks H1 receptors and is commonly fast-acting. It does not prevent the actual release of histamine from mast cells, it only prevents histamine from binding to receptors. Side effects can include dry mouth and throat.

References 

Benzimidazoles
H1 receptor antagonists
Fluoroarenes
Peripherally selective drugs
Piperidines
Pyrimidones